Audrey Samson is a Canadian multidisciplinary artist and researcher whose work points to the materiality of data and its consequences. She is largely known for her exploration of erasure as a means of knowledge production through digital data funerals.

Samson studied Media Design at the Piet Zwart Institute, where she obtained a MFA in 2007.

Together with Sabrina Basten, she co-founded Roger10-4. Their work was featured in Arte,  NRK, and Motherboard. She has been an active member of the networked performance group aether9, and the feminist tech network Genderchangers. Samson is also known by the pseudonym ideacritik, and is part of the duo FRAUD, where she collaborates with the artist Fran Gallardo.

Interviews
'Digital Data Funerals' in Behind The Smart World.
'When I go' in This is not a piece of me. Interview by Lisa Matzi. (print)
'Hackin' some coils into wearables'.

References

External links
 National Canadian Media (Radio Canada) in French ("Josée Brouillard : faire le deuil de notre mémoire virtuelle. Que faire avec nos souvenirs en format numérique ? L’artiste Audrey Samson embaume les clés USB et disques durs.") 
National Norwegian TV (NRK) 
Arte Creative (Franco-German media) 
Danish newspaper
Montreal newspaper 
Montreal newspaper
Motherboard (online Vice magazine) 
Artist website

New media artists
Canadian digital artists
Women digital artists
Canadian multimedia artists
Living people
Transdisciplinarity
Canadian performance artists
Women performance artists
Concordia University alumni
21st-century Canadian women artists
Year of birth missing (living people)